Toon Duijnhouwer (3 June 1912 – 8 September 1990) was a Dutch footballer. He played in one match for the Netherlands national football team in 1933.

References

External links
 

1912 births
1990 deaths
Dutch footballers
Netherlands international footballers
Place of birth missing
Association football forwards
Feyenoord players